L'Isle-Jourdain ( or ) was a lordship and then county near Gers in Gascony during the High Middle Ages. It took its name, Jourdain, from its crusading baron who was baptised in the River Jordan on the First Crusade. Its last count sold the fief to the King of France.

Lords
Odo c.1000–1038 
Raymond 1038–1089 
Jordan I 1089–1132 
Bernard I 1132–? 
Jordan II ?–1195  
Jordan III 1196–1205, married 1175 to Esclarmonde of Foix (died 1215), had six children
Bernard II Jordan 1205–1228, married Indie, daughter of Raymond V of Toulouse, fathered Bishop Bertrand of Toulouse
Bernard III 1228–1240 
Jordan IV 1240–1271 
Jordan V 1271–1303 or 1306  
Bernard IV Jordan 1303 or 1306–1340

Counts
Bertrand I 1340–1349 
John Jordan I 1349–1365 
Bertrand II 1365–1369 
John Jordan II 1369–1375
Jordan VI 1375–1405
John I 1405–1421

Further reading

Lists of office-holders
Counts of Isle-Jourdain
L'Isle-Jourdain